Prospect Place, also known as Trinway Mansion and Prospect Place Mansion, is a 29-room mansion built by abolitionist George Willison Adams (G. W. Adams) in Trinway, Ohio, just north of Dresden in 1856. Today, it is the home of the non-profit G. W. Adams Educational Center, Inc. The mansion is listed on the National Register of Historic Places and the Ohio Underground Railroad Association's list of Underground Railroad sites.

This home featured many new and, for the time, revolutionary innovations.  It had indoor plumbing which included a copper tank cistern on the second floor which pressurized water throughout the house.  Two coal stoves had copper tanks (under pressure from the cistern system) which heated water and allowed the home to have both hot and cold running water service.

This is the second house to stand on the same foundation.  The first house was destroyed by an arson-related fire shortly after its completion. The mansion was rebuilt after the fire, with modern fire stopping added to it.  The interior walls of the current house are solid brick, and there is a two-inch layer of mortar between the first and second floors of the house to block fire.

Prospect Place also featured a unique refrigeration system to cool milk, cheese, butter, etc.  A primitive form of "air conditioning" was created by bringing cool basement air into the living quarters during the summer months via ducts in the outside walls.

George Willison Adams
Born in Fauquier County, Virginia, in 1800 to George Beal Adams and his wife Anna Turner, George Willison Adams (or G.W. as he was called) was one of thirteen children.  His father was a plantation owner who gave up his land and home to move away from the slaveholding South.  The family migrated to southeastern Ohio in 1808, freed their slaves and settled in Madison Township, Muskingum County near the town of Dresden, Ohio.

Like his father, G. W. Adams became a strong abolitionist.  He and his brother, Edward, ran an Underground Railroad "station" from their mill at what later became known as Adams Mills, Ohio.

G. W. Adams was once a member of the Ohio General Assembly.

Together with several other prominent citizens he formed a stock company to build a suspension bridge across the Muskingum river near Dresden. When the other members of the company became fearful that the plan was not feasible and that they would lose their money, Adams built the bridge at his own expense, his nephew, George Copeland, being the engineer. The bridge was conducted as a toll bridge for several years before Adams eventually sold the bridge to the county commissioners for one-third of the original building cost of the bridge.

Later in life, Adams was the President of the Steubenville and Indiana Railroad.  He directed construction of the Cincinnati and Muskingum Valley Railroad. His land holdings totaled  with the Prospect Place Mansion in the center of his plantation.

G. W. Adams was an important figure in Ohio politics, the Underground Railroad and regional development of the southeastern Ohio area. His importance in these areas was a criterion used to include the Prospect Place Mansion on the National Register of Historic Places.

G. W. Adams was married twice.  He married Clarissa Hopkins Shaff (1824–1853) in 1845.  They had four children together—Edward Adams, Anna T. Adams Cox, Mary Adams and Elizabeth Adams Endicott.  After the death of his first wife, he married Mary Jane Robinson (1832–1915) in 1855.  They had six children together—Sophia Adams, James R. Adams, John J. Adams, Charles W. Adams, Jessie Adams Huggins and Florence Adams.  G. W. Adams died on August 31, 1879, at the age of 79.  He is buried in Dresden Cemetery in Dresden, Muskingum County, Ohio.

Underground Railroad operation 
The Underground Railroad operation conducted by G. W. Adams and his brother, Edward, was a huge undertaking. The brothers operated a flouring mill on the Ohio and Erie Canal and owned warehouses, a boat yard and cooper shops in Dresden, Ohio. When men from the Adams company would take flour to New Orleans, Louisiana, they would return with refugees (runaway slaves) beneath the decks of their boats.

It is also known that in 1856 Adams donated money to the American Colonization Society.

Recent history 

The mansion passed through the Adams-Cox family to George Cox, a grandson of G. W. Adams, who owned the property until the 1960s.  In 1969 the home was sold to a distant relative of George Cox, Eugene Cox. Eugene operated a gravel mining company, the Cox Gravel Company, which proceeded to mine the remaining  associated with the estate. Cox's wife Peggy convinced him to purchase the Edward Adams home in Adams Mills, Ohio, as well. The Cox family lived at the Adams Mills home until Eugene's death in the 1990s.

While the Cox Gravel Company owned the Prospect Place mansion, it was listed on the National Register of Historic Places.  The deterioration of the mansion increased due to lack of maintenance and vandalism. The interior of the building was all but gutted by thieves and vandals. The estate was scheduled to be demolished in 1988.  Local businessman Dave Longaberger purchased the house to prevent its destruction.

Dave Longaberger installed a new roof on the structure and increased security with the intention of restoring the home as a future Longaberger Company headquarters building. Upon choosing to construct the current headquarters of the Longaberger Basket Company in Newark, Ohio, he placed the mansion restoration project on hold.

Dave Longaberger died of cancer in the 1990s. The Longaberger Company continued to maintain security on the property until 2001 when the great-great-grandson of G. W. Adams and Longaberger relative, George J. Adams, purchased the home with the goal of finishing the restoration.

George J. Adams had investors for the project, to include adaptive reuse with a restaurant in the building. After the September 11, 2001 attacks, the investors backed out.

Adams created a non-profit, the G. W. Adams Education Center, Inc., which has owned the building since 2005.  The educational center has continued the restoration.

The building is allegedly haunted and was featured in an episode of Ghost Hunters on the SyFy Channel in April 2008.  It was also featured on Ghost Adventures on the Travel Channel on January 1, 2010.

2017: Citing failing health, George J. Adams retired as chairman of the Board of the G.W. Adams Educational Center. A new board of trustees was immediately installed and repairs and restoration work were resumed.

G. W. Adams Educational Center 
Headquartered at Prospect Place Mansion (aka the Trinway Mansion), the G. W. Adams Educational Center, Inc., was founded in 2003 by George Jeffrey Adams, a descendant of G.W. Adams.  The center operates as a historical and educational resource center for the southeastern Ohio area. The primary focus of the center is the history and restoration of the mansion, George W. Adams and his impact on local/regional communities, and Underground Railroad activities that took place at the mansion.

See also
 George W. Adams House, built 1842,  located south of Trinway on Bottom Road, also on the National Register

References

External links
 Prospect Place Official Website
 The Pioneer and Historical Society of Muskingum County
 "Prospect Place", Ohio Historical Society

African-American history of Ohio
Houses on the National Register of Historic Places in Ohio
Houses on the Underground Railroad
Houses in Muskingum County, Ohio
National Register of Historic Places in Muskingum County, Ohio
Education in Muskingum County, Ohio
Museums in Muskingum County, Ohio
Historic house museums in Ohio
Reportedly haunted locations in Ohio
1856 establishments in Ohio